The Lovers' Guide is a sex and relationships advice brand, produced by Lifetime Productions International Ltd, which launched with the release of the first Lovers' Guide video in 1991. Presented by the sexologist Dr Andrew Stanway, and produced by Robert Page and William Campbell, this became the only non-fiction film to top the UK video charts; it sold 1.3 million copies in the UK and went into 13 languages and 22 countries around the world. The release caused controversy. While the BBFC (British Board of Film Classification) granted the title an 18 certificate, which would normally be a license for general UK distribution, this was technically merely advisory and the producer, Robert Page, faced charges of obscenity, which were subsequently dropped.

The Lovers' Guide is distinct for using explicit video material to illustrate the instructional points being made. While the explicit nature of the visual content would usually warrant an R18 certificate in the UK, restricting sales to licensed sex shops, all Lovers' Guide videos and DVDs have been granted 18 certificates.

Lovers' Guide products has expanded to ten further DVDs, a book, an encyclopaedia, two CD-ROMs and cassettes and CDs of the soundtracks. It has also been shown on encrypted television. These have been produced, distributed and retailed with partners such as W.H. Smith, Woolworths, Carlton, Bloomsbury, Warners, Sony and Universal.

Lovers' Guide programmes 
 The Lovers' Guide, 1991
 The Lovers' Guide: Making Sex Even Better, 1992
 The Lovers' Guide: Better Orgasms, 1993
 The Essential Lovers' Guide, 1996
 The Lovers' Guide: Secrets of Sensational Sex, 1999
 The Lovers' Guide: What Women Really Want, 2002
 The Lovers' Guide: Sex Positions, 2003
 The Lovers' Guide: Sex Play, 2004
 The Lovers' Guide: Satisfaction Guaranteed: 7 Secrets to a Passionate Love Life, 2005
 The Lovers' Guide Interactive, 2008
 The Lovers' Guide 3D: Igniting Desire, 2011

External links 
 
 

Documentary films about sexuality